William Hodson Brock (born 1936) is a British chemist and science historian.

Brock was born in Brighton. He studied chemistry at University College London and the history and philosophy of science at the University of Leicester to become a lecturer on the subject. His earned a Ph.D. for his biography of the chemist William Prout which was expanded into the book, From Protyle to Proton: William Prout and the Nature of Matter, 1785–1985 (1985). Brock remained at Leicester until he retired in 1998 as Emeritus Professor of History of Science.

Brock has written biographies of famous chemists such as Justus von Liebig, August Wilhelm von Hofmann and William Crookes.

In 1995, Brock received the Dexter Award for Outstanding Achievement in the History of Chemistry from the American Chemical Society.

Publications

Justus von Liebig und August Wilhelm Hofmann in ihren Briefen (1841-1873) (1984)
From Protyle to Proton: William Prout and the Nature of Matter, 1785-1985 (1985)
The Fontana History of Chemistry (1992)
 The Norton History of Chemistry (1993)
Science for All: Studies in the History of Victorian Science and Education (1996)
William Crookes (1832-1919) and the Commercialization of Science (2008)
The Case of the Poisonous Socks: Tales from Chemistry (2011)

References

1936 births
British chemists
British science writers
Historians of science
People from Brighton
Living people